A hot dog bun is a type of soft bun shaped specifically to contain a hot dog or another type of sausage.

The side-loading bun is common in most of the United States, while the top-loading New England-style hot dog bun is popular in that region. Other regional variations include the addition of poppy seeds to the buns of Chicago-style hot dogs.

History
Hot dog historian and professor emeritus at Roosevelt University Bruce Kraig believes the term "hot dog" was invented in the late 19th century by American observers of German immigrants, who ate sausages on buns. The Americans joked that the sausages looked suspiciously like the Germans' dachshunds.

Charles Feltman invented an elongated hot dog bun on Coney Island in 1871 according to writer Jefferey Stanton.

According to an obituary of Austrian immigrant baker Ignatz Frischmann published in 1904, the "Vienna roll" supplied to Coney Island hot dog vendors was invented by Frischmann and made him a rich man sometime before his death.

At the 1904 Louisiana Purchase Exposition, in St. Louis, Missouri, a German concessionaire, Antoine Feuchtwanger, served hot sausages called 'frankfurters', after his birthplace, Frankfurt, in Hesse. At first he loaned gloves for his customers to hold his sausages. When many were not returned, he asked his brother, who was a baker, to invent a solution. Thus, the hot dog bun was born.

Regional variations
Split-top hot dog buns are popular in New England for lobster rolls and clam sandwiches.

In Chicago, Illinois, where poppy-seed buns are popularly served with Chicago-style hot dogs, the buns are made with high-gluten flour to hold up to steaming.

In Austria, Poland, and throughout Central Europe a "hot dog" is a baguette which is hollowed out by cutting off the end and impaling it on a spike so a sausage can be inserted. In Denmark this variation is known as a "French Hot Dog" because of the use of baguette, and a "French Hot Dog Dressing" which contains Dijon Mustard. Specially prepared baguettes are made for this popular food.

See also
 New England-style hot dog bun
 List of buns

References

Buns
Hot dogs